Twin Butte is a hamlet in Southern Alberta, Canada within the Municipal District of Pincher Creek No. 9. The hamlet of Twin Butte is historically known as a small ranching community located in the foothills of Alberta's Southwest region. The community has a general store, post office, Restaurant and a community hall along Highway 6 north of Township Road 40.

History 

Between 1885 and 1915, 43 ranching families settled the region. The community was given its name by Tillie Mitchell a prominent earlier pioneer to the area in the early 1900s. The name was given after two small hills, visible landmarks similar in shape and size overlooking the Yarrow Creek to the north of Mitchell's property, both noticeable to many travelers, traveling through the area.

The first post office in the area was the Yarrow Post Office, established on April 1, 1895, with Bob Christie as first Postmaster. It operated until closing in 1911. The Twin Butte Post Office was established on June 1, 1905, with Ed Mitchell Sr. as first Postmaster. The post office continues to operate over a century later, out of the Twin Butte General Store. A popular stopping point for travelers and tourists along The Cowboy Trail (Highway 6), between the town of Pincher Creek and Waterton Lakes National Park.

Education 

In 1904 Ernest Hillier donated land 1 mile east of Twin Butte to build a schoolhouse. The Twin Butte School District No. 988 was then established, with classes first held September 1, 1904. The schoolhouse stood on the Southwest Quarter of Section 3, Township 4, Range 29, West of the 4th meridian. The school was used until consolidation of area schoolhouses in June 1958. Around 254 students attended school at Twin Butte. Today area children are bused to Pincher Creek for schooling.

Demographics 

See also 
List of communities in Alberta
List of designated places in Alberta
List of hamlets in Alberta

References 

Hamlets in Alberta
Designated places in Alberta
Municipal District of Pincher Creek No. 9